The G. Evelyn Hutchinson Award is an award granted annually by the Association for the Sciences of Limnology and Oceanography to a mid-career scientist for work accomplished during the preceding 5–10 years for excellence in any aspect of limnology or oceanography. The award is named in honor of the ecologist and limnologist G. Evelyn Hutchinson. Hutchinson requested that recipients of the award have made considerable contributions to knowledge, and that their future work promise a continuing legacy of scientific excellence.

Awardees 
Information about the award from Association for the Sciences of Limnology and Oceanography, unless otherwise noted with additional citations.

See also
 List of oceanography awards

References

External links 
 ASLO Awards
 Hutchinson Award: details on recipients and links to award presentations

Oceanography awards
Awards established in 1982
1982 establishments in the United States